The 2008 Copa Telmex was a tennis tournament played on outdoor clay courts. It was the 11th edition of the event known that year as Copa Telmex, and was part of the International Series of the 2008 ATP Tour. It took place at the Buenos Aires Lawn Tennis Club in Buenos Aires, Argentina, from February 18 through February 24, 2008.

The singles field was led by ATP No. 11, 2007 Madrid Masters and 2007 Paris Masters champion David Nalbandian, Viña del Mar singles and doubles runner-up Juan Mónaco, and Costa do Sauípe finalist Carlos Moyá. Other seeds were 2007 US Open quarterfinalist Juan Ignacio Chela, Costa do Sauípe winner Nicolás Almagro, Igor Andreev, Potito Starace and Filippo Volandri.

Entrants

Seeds

Other entrants
The following players received wildcards into the main draw:

 Eduardo Schwank
 Máximo González

The following players received entry from the qualifying draw:

 Thomaz Bellucci
 Daniel Gimeno Traver
 Rubén Ramírez Hidalgo
 Ivo Minář

The following player received entry by a Special Exempt (SE):

 Nicolás Lapentti

The following players received Lucky loser into the main draw:

 Éric Prodon

Finals

Singles

 David Nalbandian defeated  José Acasuso, 3–6, 7–6(7–5), 6–4
It was David Nalbandian's 1st title of the year, and his 8th overall.

Doubles

 Agustín Calleri /  Luis Horna defeated  Werner Eschauer /  Peter Luczak, 6–0, 6–7(6–8), [10–2]

References

External links
Official website
ATP tournament profile
Singles draw
Doubles draw
Qualifying Singles draw